Alioune Ba (born 7 May 1989) is a French professional footballer who plays as a defender for the Turkish club Manisa.

Personal life
Born in France, Ba is of Senegalese descent.

References

1989 births
People from Évry, Essonne
Footballers from Essonne
French sportspeople of Senegalese descent
Living people
French footballers
Association football defenders
ES Viry-Châtillon players
AC Amiens players
Amiens SC players
US Quevilly-Rouen Métropole players
Stade Lavallois players
US Orléans players
USL Dunkerque players
Manisa FK footballers
Ligue 2 players
Championnat National players
Championnat National 2 players
Championnat National 3 players
TFF First League players
French expatriate footballers
Expatriate footballers in Turkey
French expatriate sportspeople in Turkey